Cowtail pine is a common name for several plants and may refer to:

 Trees of the genus Cephalotaxus, also known as the plum yews
 Specifically, the species Cephalotaxus harringtonii, also known as the Japanese plum yew